The 1938 Boston Red Sox season was the 38th season in the franchise's Major League Baseball history. The Red Sox finished second in the American League (AL) with a record of 88 wins and 61 losses,  games behind the New York Yankees, who went on to win the 1938 World Series.

Red Sox first baseman Jimmie Foxx had a .349 batting average with 50 home runs and 175 runs batted in; he was named the AL Most Valuable Player.

Offseason 
 December 2, 1937: Red Kress, Buster Mills and Bobo Newsom were traded by the Red Sox to the St. Louis Browns for Joe Vosmik.

Regular season 
The 1938 Boston Red Sox finished higher than any other Sox team since 1918. The Red Sox finished in second place with 88 wins and 61 losses, finishing  games behind the New York Yankees. Jimmie Foxx led the American League with a .349 batting average, 50 home runs and 175 RBIs, becoming the first player to win three American League MVP Awards.

Season standings

Record vs. opponents

Opening Day lineup

Roster

Player stats

Batting

Starters by position 
Note: Pos = Position; G = Games played; AB = At bats; H = Hits; Avg. = Batting average; HR = Home runs; RBI = Runs batted in

Other batters 
Note: G = Games played; AB = At bats; H = Hits; Avg. = Batting average; HR = Home runs; RBI = Runs batted in

Pitching

Starting pitchers 
Note: G = Games pitched; IP = Innings pitched; W = Wins; L = Losses; ERA = Earned run average; SO = Strikeouts

Other pitchers 
Note: G = Games pitched; IP = Innings pitched; W = Wins; L = Losses; ERA = Earned run average; SO = Strikeouts

Relief pitchers 
Note: G = Games pitched; W = Wins; L = Losses; SV = Saves; ERA = Earned run average; SO = Strikeouts

Farm system

References

External links
1938 Boston Red Sox team page at Baseball Reference
1938 Boston Red Sox season at baseball-almanac.com

Boston Red Sox seasons
Boston Red Sox
Boston Red Sox
1930s in Boston